The Inti Raymi (Quechua for "Inti festival") is a traditional religious ceremony of the Inca Empire in honor of the god Inti (Quechua for "sun"), the most venerated deity in Inca religion. It was the celebration of the winter solstice – the shortest day of the year in terms of the time between sunrise and sunset – and the Inca New Year, when the hours of light would begin to lengthen again. In territories south of the equator, the Gregorian months of June and July are winter months. It is held on June 24.

During the Inca Empire, the Inti Raymi was the most important of four ceremonies celebrated in Cusco, as related by Inca Garcilaso de la Vega. The celebration took place in the Haukaypata or the main plaza in the city.

Overview
According to chronicler Garcilaso de la Vega, Sapa Inca Pachacuti created the Inti Raymi to celebrate the new year in the Andes of the Southern Hemisphere. The ceremony was also said to symbolize the mythical origin of the Inca people. It lasted for nine days and was filled with colorful dances and processions, as well as animal sacrifices to thank Pachamama and to ensure a good harvest season. The first Inti Raymi was in 1412. The last Inti Raymi with the Inca Emperor's presence was carried out in 1535. After this, the Spanish colonists and their Catholic priests banned the ceremony and other Inca religious practices.

In 1944, a historical reconstruction of the Inti Raymi was directed by Faustino Espinoza Navarro and indigenous actors. The first reconstruction was based largely on the chronicles of Garcilaso de la Vega and referred only to the religious ceremony. Since 1944, an annual theatrical representation of the Inti Raymi has been taking place at Saksaywaman on June 24, two kilometers (1.24 miles) from the original site of celebration in central Cusco. It attracts thousands of tourists and local visitors.

Inti Raymi is still celebrated in indigenous cultures throughout the Andes. Celebrations involve music, wearing of colorful costumes (most notable the woven aya huma mask), and the sharing of food. In many parts of the Andes though, this celebration has also been connected to the western Catholic festivals of Saint John the Baptist (June 24), which falls a few days after the southern winter solstice (June 21).  The celebration today begins at Qorikancha, followed by the Plaza de Armas, and other important sites of the Incan times.

References

External links

The celebration of the Sun
Inti Raymi - Cultura Interactiva

Peruvian culture
Festivals in Peru
Inca mythology
June observances
New Year celebrations
Winter holidays (Southern Hemisphere)